Von Neumann's elephant is a problem in recreational mathematics, consisting of constructing a planar curve in the shape of an elephant from only four fixed parameters. It originated from a discussion between physicists John von Neumann and Enrico Fermi.

History
In a 2004 article in the journal Nature, Freeman Dyson recounts his meeting with Fermi in 1953. Fermi evokes his friend von Neumann who, when asking him how many arbitrary parameters he used for his calculations, replied, "With four parameters I can fit an elephant, and with five I can make him wiggle his trunk." By this he meant that the Fermi simulations relied on too many input parameters, presupposing an overfitting phenomenon.

Solving the problem (defining four complex numbers to draw an elephantine shape) subsequently became an active research subject of recreational mathematics.  A 1975 attempt through least-squares function approximation required dozens of terms. The best approximation was found by three physicists in 2010.

Construction
The construction is based on complex Fourier analysis.

The curve found in 2010 is parameterized by:

The affix point  is added to make the eye of the elephant and this value serves as a parameter for the movement of the "trunk".

See also 
 Epicycloid
 Curve fitting

References

External links
 "Fitting an Elephant" at the Wolfram Demonstrations Project site

Curves
Recreational mathematics